Kion Group AG (styled as KION Group) is a German multinational manufacturer of materials handling equipment, with its headquarters in Frankfurt, Hesse, Germany.  Its principal products are intralogistics, warehouse automation equipment, and industrial (forklift) trucks.  KION Group was founded in 2006 by the demerger of The Linde Group's materials handling equipment operations. It is the world's second-largest manufacturer of forklifts measured by revenues (after Toyota Industries).

Name
"Kion" is an invented name derived from the Swahili word "Kiongozi", which means "leader".

History
On 6 September 2006 Linde AG announced a new structure following the completion of its acquisition of The BOC Group, with the gas and engineering businesses of the combined entity operating as The Linde Group and the materials handling businesses (Linde Material Handling, STILL, and OM Carrelli Elevatori S.p.A.) operating as KION Group. Linde AG sold KION Group to a partnership of Kohlberg Kravis Roberts and Goldman Sachs Capital Partners for approximately €4 billion.

In January 2009 KION Group formed a China-based forklift manufacturing joint venture, Kion Baoli (Jiangsu) Forklift, with Jiangsu Shangqi Group and Jingjiang Baoli Forklift. In May 2010 KION Group acquired full management control of Kion Baoli.

In March 2011, KION Group and the Indian engineering company Voltas agreed to form a new joint venture, Voltas Materials Handling, comprising the two companies' material handling equipment operations in India. KION Group acquired Voltas' 34% shareholding in the venture in November 2012.

In August 2012, the China-based Shandong Heavy Industry's Weichai Power subsidiary agreed to acquire a 25% stake in KION Group for €467 million, and a 70% majority stake in Kion's hydraulics business for €271 million.

In February 2013 KION Group agreed to sell the product rights to the Linde brand's reach stacker, empty container handler and laden container handler product lines to the Finnish crane manufacturer Konecranes for an undisclosed sum.

In June 2016 KION Group acquired Dematic to make them the global leader in advanced material handling solutions.

In July 2019, an announcement by KION Group and BMZ Holdings mentioned they will host a 50/50 joint venture that will manufacture lithium-ion batteries (64V, 48V) for the KION Group's trucks at the BMZ HQ manufacturing facility.

Brands 
KION Group sells its products under the following brand names:
 Baoli 
 Fenwick
 Linde Material Handling
 OM STILL
 STILL
 Voltas (only in Material Handling)
 Dematic

References 

Manufacturing companies based in Frankfurt
Forklift truck manufacturers
Companies established in 2006
2013 initial public offerings
Companies listed on the Frankfurt Stock Exchange
Companies in the MDAX